Loris Vellar (born 7 November 1950) is an Italian speed skater. He competed in the men's 5000 metres event at the 1976 Winter Olympics.

References

External links
 

1950 births
Living people
Italian male speed skaters
Olympic speed skaters of Italy
Speed skaters at the 1976 Winter Olympics
Sportspeople from the Province of Vicenza